"You Should See Me in a Crown" is a song by American singer-songwriter Billie Eilish and the lead single of her debut studio album, When We All Fall Asleep, Where Do We Go? (2019). It was released on July 18, 2018, through Darkroom and Interscope Records. It was written by Eilish and her brother Finneas O'Connell, who also produced the track. The song received positive reviews and charted in countries including the US, Canada and Australia.

Background and release
The song's title was inspired by a scene from the third episode of the second season of BBC television series Sherlock titled "The Reichenbach Fall", where the villain Jim Moriarty says the line "Honey, you should see me in a crown". Eilish and O'Connell, who are fans of the series, thought that the line was "dope" and decided to write a song around the quote. The song "Human" by Iranian-Dutch singer Sevdaliza was also cited as one of the track's influences.

The song was released on a 7-inch vinyl, along with "Bitches Broken Hearts" as the B-side on October 20, 2018, and was sold exclusively during her 1 By 1 Tour.

Composition and lyrics
The song is a trap-influenced electropop and industrial song featuring Eilish singing over "blaring synths and rapid-fire hi-hats." The chorus utilizes a "thumping bass (that) slithers menacingly." Additionally, the opening incorporates a recording of Eilish's father sharpening knives.

Critics have described Eilish's vocals as "whispered" and "mumbled". Lyrically, the song features Eilish plotting for world dominance.

Release and promotion
The track was premiered on Annie Mac's BBC Radio 1 show on July 18, 2018. Two days later, Eilish posted a video of a tarantula crawling out of her mouth on her social media accounts with the caption "u scared?" In October, she made her daytime television debut on The Ellen DeGeneres Show performing the song inside a glass box with a crown on her head. The Ringer deemed the performance the ninth most awkward on the show in 2018. The song was used as the official theme song for the professional wrestling pay-per-view event NXT TakeOver: New York.

Reception
The song was well received by music critics; many noted that it was significantly darker than Eilish's previous work. NMEs Thomas Smith reacted positively towards the song, writing "she's not playing nice anymore. Kicking off with some mumbled vocals and a melody that sounds like the most sinister nursery rhyme you ever heard, Billie's sending for everyone." Raisa Bruner of Time featured the song on her "5 Songs You Need to Listen to" list on the week of July 20, 2018 and wrote "Eilish finds a vibe that's the right kind of eerie as she makes an unabashedly dark statement of confidence and purpose." Jacob Moore of Complex called the track "a gorgeously written song with a pop core and an unforgettable chorus, but dark undertones give it an dynamic edge."

Billboard named the single the 50th best song of 2018, and PopMatters gave it the same ranking.

Music videos

Vertical video
A vertical music video for the track was released in August 2018 featuring Eilish covered in spiders as she sings the song. Eilish cited a woman called "Diana" as an inspiration for the video, saying of her: "She showed me how she puts the spider in her mouth, and then I did it. Spiders on my face and hair...I loved it." The vertical video was later released as a full-screen video, albeit with the same recording and audio.

Official video
In March 2019, Eilish released the official music video for the track, directed and animated by Takashi Murakami, with whom she had previously collaborated for the cover of Garage Magazine, on Apple Music, before posting it to YouTube the following month. Murakami stated in a press release that the anime-style video, which was animated using motion capture technology, took eight months for him to create. The video opens with an animated version of Eilish, dressed in a neon-green shirt and shorts. This modified Eilish tries on a black spider hoodie and eventually morphs into a spider-like monster that wreaks havoc on a miniature city. The video features the first appearance of the "Blohsh," Eilish's signature logo, as well as Murakami's flowers.

Usage in media
"You Should See Me in a Crown" was used in a promotional ad for the boxing match between Deontay Wilder and Tyson Fury. It also features on FIFA 19 and FIFA 23. It was later featured in the fifth episode of the American series Euphoria as well as in Season 3 of Queen of the South.  It also appears in the sixth episode of season one of the Amazon Prime series Hanna. It was featured in the seventh episode of the second season of the Marvel/Hulu series Runaways. It was also one of the official theme songs for NXT TakeOver: New York. It was also played at the end of the first episode of  Emergence as well as at the end of the ninth episode of Netflix's “Locke & Key.” The song was also used in contortionist Marina Mazepa's quarterfinal performance on America's Got Talent in 2019. In This Moment singer Maria Brink performed a cover of this song. In 2022 it was featured in the second episode of the second season of Only Murders in the Building.  It was also used in the Netflix movie The School for Good and Evil.

Credits and personnel
Credits adapted from Tidal and the 7-inch vinyl liner notes.

 Billie Eilish vocals, songwriter
 Finneas O'Connell producer, songwriter, engineer, bass, synthesizers, drum programming, arrangement, vocal sampling, knife sharpening recording
 Casey Cuayo assistant mixer, studio personnel
 Rob Kinelski mixer, studio personnel
 John Greenham mastering engineer, studio personnel
 Benoit Louis Andre Roger Bardou  songwriter

Charts

Weekly charts

Year-end charts

Certifications

Release history

Notes

References

External links
 
 
 You Should See Me In A Crown Lyrics - Billie Eilish

2018 singles
2018 songs
Interscope Records singles
Songs written by Finneas O'Connell
Billie Eilish songs
Song recordings produced by Finneas O'Connell
Songs written by Billie Eilish
Animated music videos
Electropop songs
Sherlock (TV series)
Vertically-oriented music videos